"Eight Miles" is a science fiction short story by Sean McMullen. It was first published in Analog Science Fiction in 2010.

Synopsis

In 1840, hot air balloonist Harold Parkes is hired to perform an extended ascent to a hazardous altitude... and to bring a strange passenger with him.

Reception

"Eight Miles" was a finalist for the 2011 Hugo Award for Best Novelette, and was ranked second.

References

External links

Works originally published in Analog Science Fiction and Fact